Short track speed skating at the 2011 Winter Universiade will held at the Atatürk University in Erzurum.

Men's events

Women's events

* Skaters who did not participate in the final, but received medals.

Medals table

References 

Short track speed skating
Winter Universiade
Speed skating in Turkey
2011